2013 in sports is listing and describing the major sporting events from the current year: by month and by discipline. The year after the 2012 Summer Olympics and the year before the 2014 Winter Olympics.

Calendar by month

January

February

March

April

May

June

July

August

September

October

November

December

Alpine skiing

American football

 Super Bowl XLVII – the Baltimore Ravens (AFC) won 34–31 over the San Francisco 49ers (NFC)
Location: Superdome
Attendance: 71,024
MVP: Joe Flacco, QB (Baltimore)
7 January: BCS National Championship Game at Sun Life Stadium in Miami Gardens, Florida. (2012 season):
 The Alabama Crimson Tide defeat the Notre Dame Fighting Irish 42–14. It is the second consecutive national title, third in the last four years, and 15th overall for Alabama.
June 28 – July 6: 2013 IFAF Women's World Championship in Vantaa (Helsinki), Finland
 Champions:  (second consecutive title); Second: ; Third:

Aquatics

Archery
 May 13 – August 25: 2013 FITA Archery World Cup
 May 13 – 19 at  Shanghai
  won both gold and overall medal tallies.
 June 10–16 at  Antalya
  won both gold and overall medal tallies.
 July 15–21 at  Medellín
However, the  won the overall medal tally, too.
 August 19–25 at  Wrocław
  won both the gold and overall medal tallies.
 September 21 & 22: FITA World Cup Final in Paris
 September 29 – October 6: 2013 World Archery Championships at  Belek (Antalya)
  won both the gold and overall medal tallies.
 October 8–12: 2013 World Archery 3D Championships at  Sassari
 Host nation, won both the gold and overall medal tallies.
 October 13–20: 2013 World Archery Youth Championships at  Wuxi
  won both the gold and overall medal tallies.
 November 1–7: 2013 World Archery Para Championships at  Bangkok
  won the gold medal tally.  won the overall medal tally.

Artistic gymnastics

Association football

 5–18 January: The 21st Arabian Gulf Cup took place in Bahrain
 Champions:  (second title), Second: , Third: 
 19 January – 10 February: The 2013 Africa Cup of Nations was held in South Africa
 Champions:  (third title), Second: , Third: 
 18–27 January: The 2013 Copa Centroamericana was held in Costa Rica
 Champions:  (seventh title), Second: , Third: 
 March 6–13: The 2013 Algarve Cup was held in Portugal.
 Champions:  (ninth title), Second: , Third: 
 2013 AFC Champions League (First leg of final at the Seoul World Cup Stadium (South Korea); second leg at the Tianhe Stadium in Guangzhou, China)
  Guangzhou Evergrande F.C. defeated  FC Seoul by the away goals rule. Guangzhou Evergrande represents the AFC region at the 2013 FIFA Club World Cup.
 2013 CAF Champions League (First leg of final at the Orlando Stadium (Johannesburg, South Africa); second leg at the 30 June Stadium in Cairo, Egypt)
  Al Ahly defeated the  Orlando Pirates 3–1 on aggregate. Al Ahly represents the CAF region at the 2013 FIFA Club World Cup.
 2012–13 CONCACAF Champions League (First leg of final at Estadio Corona in Torreón; second leg at Estadio Tecnológico in Monterrey)
  Monterrey defeated fellow Mexican team, Santos Laguna, 4–2 on aggregate. Monterrey represents the CONCACAF region at the 2013 FIFA Club World Cup.
 2013 Copa Libertadores (First leg of final at Estadio Defensores del Chaco in Asunción; second leg at Mineirão in Belo Horizonte)
 After a 2–2 tie on aggregate a.e.t.,  Atlético Mineiro defeated  Olimpia 4–3 on penalties to claim its first title in this tournament. Atlético Mineiro represents the CONMEBOL region at the 2013 FIFA Club World Cup.
 2012–13 OFC Champions League (final at Mount Smart Stadium, Auckland)
  Auckland City defeated fellow New Zealand team, Waitakere United, 2–1 in the final. Auckland City represents the OFC region at the 2013 FIFA Club World Cup.
 2012–13 UEFA Champions League (final at Wembley Stadium, London)
  Bayern Munich defeated fellow German team, Borussia Dortmund, 2–1 to claim its fifth title in this tournament. Bayern Munich represents the UEFA region at the 2013 FIFA Club World Cup.
 2012–13 UEFA Europa League (final at Amsterdam Arena, Amsterdam)
  Chelsea defeated  Benfica 2–1 to win the team's first Europa title.
 2012–13 UEFA Women's Champions League (final at Stamford Bridge, London)
  Wolfsburg defeated  Lyon 1–0 to win its first title.
 June 5–18: The 2013 UEFA European Under-21 Football Championship was held in Israel
  defeated  4–2 to claim its fourth title in this event.
 June 15–30: The 2013 FIFA Confederations Cup was held in Brazil (final at Estádio do Maracanã).
 Host nation  defeated  3–0 to win its fourth title in this event.
 June 21 – July 13: The 2013 FIFA U-20 World Cup was held in Turkey
 After a 0–0 tie,  defeated  4–1 on penalties to claim its first title in this event.
 July 7–28: The 2013 CONCACAF Gold Cup was in the United States
 The  defeated  1–0 to claim its fifth title in this event, and advances to a playoff against the 2015 Gold Cup winner for a spot in the 2017 FIFA Confederations Cup.
 July 10–28: The UEFA Women's Euro 2013 was held in Sweden
  defeated  1–0 to claim its eighth title for this event.
 October 17 – November 8: The 2013 FIFA U-17 World Cup was held in the United Arab Emirates
  defeated  3–0 to win its fourth title in this event.
 December 11–22: The 2013 FIFA Club World Cup will be held in Morocco
  FC Bayern Munich defeated  Raja Casablanca, 2–0, to claim its first Club World Cup title.

Athletics

 March 1–3: 2013 European Athletics Indoor Championships in Gothenburg, Sweden
  won both gold and overall medals tally.
 March 24: 2013 IAAF World Cross Country Championships in Bydgoszcz, Poland
  won the gold medal tally;  won the overall medal tally.
 April 6 – September 8: IAAF World Challenge
 May 10 – September 6: 2013 IAAF Diamond League
 The  has the most overall winners in these one-day events of the IAAF DL.
 July 10–14: 2013 2013 World Youth Championships in Athletics in Donetsk, Ukraine
  won the gold medal tally;  won the overall medal tally.
 August 10–18: 2013 World Championships in Athletics in Moscow
 Host nation, Russia, won the gold medal tally; United States won the overall medal tally.

Baseball

 The Houston Astros move from the National League to the American League
 March 2–19: The 2013 World Baseball Classic was held. First-round matches were played in Japan, Taiwan, Puerto Rico, and the United States. Japan and the US hosted the second round, and the final was organised in San Francisco.  became the first undefeated team in the tournament's history, beating  in the final game by the score of 3–0. Robinson Canó was named tournament MVP.
 July 16: The 2013 Major League Baseball All-Star Game was held at Citi Field, home of the New York Mets.
 The American League defeated the National League, with the score of 3–0. It is the American League's 39th win overall. The MVP of the match is Mariano Rivera, of the New York Yankees.
 October 23–30: 2013 World Series
 Winner:  Boston Red Sox. The MVP of the series is David Ortiz of the Boston Red Sox. Also, this is the team's eighth World Series title.

Basketball

 October 11, 2012 – May 12, 2013: 2012–13 Euroleague
  Olympiacos Piraeus defeated  Real Madrid 100–88 in the final for their second consecutive Euroleague title and third overall. Vassilis Spanoulis of Olympiacos is named Final Four MVP after having been named season MVP.
 November 6, 2012 – April 13, 2013: 2012–13 Eurocup Basketball
  PBC Lokomotiv Kuban defeated  Uxue Bilbao Basket 75–64 in the final.
 October 30, 2012 – June 20, 2013: 2012–13 NBA season
 Miami Heat defeated the  San Antonio Spurs 4–3 in the best-of-7 NBA Finals to claim their third NBA title.
 17 February: All-Star Game in Houston
 The West Conference defeated the East Conference 143–138. Chris Paul, of the Los Angeles Clippers, was named as the MVP of the game.
 March 19 – April 8: NCAA Division I Men's Basketball Tournament
Louisville defeated Michigan 82–76 in the championship game. The win gave Louisville its first championship since 1986, and third overall.
 March 23 – April 9: NCAA Division I Women's Basketball Tournament
Connecticut defeated Louisville 93–60 to win its eighth national championship.
 February 1 – April 13: 2013 FIBA Americas League
  EC Pinheiros   Lanús   Capitanes de Arecibo
 June 15–30: EuroBasket Women 2013 in France; final at the Pévèle Arena in Orchies
  defeated  70–69 to claim its second title in this event.
 August 30 – September 11: 2013 FIBA Americas Championship for Men in  Caracas
  defeated  91–89 to win its first title.
 September 4–22: FIBA EuroBasket 2013 in Slovenia; final at Arena Stožice in Ljubljana
  defeated  80–66 to win its first title.
 September 21–28: FIBA Americas Championship for Women in  Xalapa
  defeated  79–71 to claim its fourth title in this event.
 October 4–6: 2013 FIBA Intercontinental Cup in  São Paulo
  Olympiacos Piraeus defeated EC Pinheiros 2–0 in a series to claim its first title in this event.

Beach soccer
 May 24 – August 11: 2013 Euro Beach Soccer League. Superfinal and Promotional Final at  Torredembarra, from August 8–11
  wins its third EBSL title (Superfinal).  won the Promotional final.
 September 18–28: 2013 FIFA Beach Soccer World Cup in  Papeete
  defeated  5–1 to claim its second title.  came in third here.

Beach volleyball

Biathlon

BMX (supercross) biking

Bobsleigh and skeleton

Canadian football

 November 23: 49th Vanier Cup in Quebec City
  Laval Rouge et Or defeated the  Calgary Dinos 25–14 to win its eighth title.
 November 24: 101st Grey Cup in Regina, Saskatchewan
  Saskatchewan Roughriders defeated the  Hamilton Tiger-Cats 45–23 to win its fourth Grey Cup.

Canoe sprint (flatwater racing)

Cricket

 Winner:

Curling

Fencing
August 5–12: 2013 World Fencing Championships in Budapest, Hungary

Field hockey
 August 17–24: 2013 Women's EuroHockey Nations Championship at  Boom
  defeated  in a penalty shootout to win its second title.
 August 17–25: 2013 Men's EuroHockey Nations Championship at  Boom
  defeated , to win its eighth title.
 November 30 – December 8: 2012–13 Women's FIH Hockey World League Final at  San Miguel de Tucumán
 The  defeated  5–1 to win its first title.

Figure skating

Floorball
 Women's World Floorball Championships
 Champion: 
 Men's under-19 World Floorball Championships
 Champion: 
 Champions Cup
 Men's champion:  IBF Falun
 Women's champion:  Rönnby IBK

Freestyle skiing

Golf

Men's
Major championships
April 11–14: Masters Tournament
Winner:  Adam Scott (first title and first major)
June 13–16: U.S. Open
Winner:  Justin Rose (first title and first major)
July 18–21: Open Championship
Winner:  Phil Mickelson (first title and fifth major)
August 8–11: PGA Championship
Winner:  Jason Dufner (first title and first major)

Other significant events
 October 3–6: 2013 Presidents Cup at Muirfield Village in  Dublin, Ohio
 Team USA defeated Team International 18½ – 15½, to claim its eighth title.
 November 21–24: 2013 World Cup of Golf at the  Royal Melbourne Golf Club
 Individual winner:  Jason Day
 Team winner:  Jason Day and Adam Scott

Women's
Major championships
April 4–7: Kraft Nabisco Championship
Winner:  Inbee Park (first title and second major)
June 6–9: LPGA Championship
Winner:  Inbee Park (first title and third major)
June 27–30: U.S. Women's Open
Winner:  Inbee Park (second title and fourth major)
August 1–4: Women's British Open
Winner:  Stacy Lewis (first title and second major)
September 12–15: The Evian Championship
Winner:  Suzann Pettersen (first title and second major)

Other significant events
 August 15–18: Solheim Cup at Colorado Golf Club in  Parker, Colorado
  Team Europe wins 18–10. It is Team Europe's first Solheim Cup win on American soil, and also the first time that the Europeans retain the Cup.

Handball
 September 22, 2012 – May 12, 2013: 2012–13 EHF Women's Champions League.
 Winner:  Győri Audi ETO KC (first title)
 September 26, 2012 – June 2, 2013: 2012–13 EHF Champions League.
 Winner:  HSV Hamburg (first title)
 January 11–27: 2013 World Men's Handball Championship in 
 defeated  by the score of 35–19 to win their second title.  won the bronze medal.
 December 7–22: 2013 World Women's Handball Championship in 
  defeated , 22–20, to claim its first title.

Ice hockey

Indoor lacrosse
 5 January – 16 March: 2013 North American Lacrosse League season
 Champions:  Boston Rockhoppers
 5 January – 11 May: 2013 National Lacrosse League season
 Champions:  Rochester Knighthawks (fourth title).

Luge

Mixed martial arts
The following is a list of major noteworthy MMA events by month.

January

1/12 — Strikeforce: Marquardt vs. Saffiedine

1/19 — UFC on FX: Belfort vs. Bisping

1/26 — UFC on Fox: Johnson vs. Dodson

February

2/2 — ONE Fighting Championship: Return of Warriors

2/2 — UFC 156: Aldo vs. Edgar

2/16 — UFC on Fuel TV: Barão vs. McDonald

2/23 — UFC 157: Rousey vs. Carmouche

March

3/2 — UFC on Fuel TV: Silva vs. Stann

3/16 — UFC 158: St-Pierre vs. Diaz

April

4/5 — ONE Fighting Championship: Kings and Champions

4/6 — UFC on Fuel TV: Mousasi vs. Latifi

4/13 — The Ultimate Fighter: Team Jones vs. Team Sonnen Finale

4/20 — UFC on Fox: Henderson vs. Melendez

4/27 — UFC 159: Jones vs. Sonnen

May

5/18 — UFC on FX: Belfort vs. Rockhold

5/25 — UFC 160: Velasquez vs. Bigfoot 2

5/31 — ONE Fighting Championship: Rise to Power

June

6/8 — UFC on Fuel TV: Nogueira vs. Werdum

6/15 — UFC 161: Evans vs. Henderson

July

7/6 — UFC 162: Silva vs. Weidman

7/27 — UFC on Fox: Johnson vs. Moraga

August

8/3 — UFC 163: Aldo vs. Korean Zombie

8/17 — UFC Fight Night: Shogun vs. Sonnen

8/28 — UFC Fight Night: Condit vs. Kampmann 2

8/31 — UFC 164: Henderson vs. Pettis II

September

9/4 — UFC Fight Night: Teixeira vs. Bader

9/13 — ONE Fighting Championship: Champions & Warriors

9/21 — UFC 165: Jones vs. Gustafsson

October

10/9 — UFC Fight Night: Maia vs. Shields

10/18 — ONE Fighting Championship: Total Domination

10/19 — UFC 166: Velasquez vs. Dos Santos 3

10/26 — UFC Fight Night: Machida vs. Muñoz

November

11/6 — UFC: Fight for the Troops 3

11/9 — UFC Fight Night: Belfort vs. Henderson 2

11/16 — UFC 167: St-Pierre vs. Hendricks

11/30 — The Ultimate Fighter: Team Rousey vs. Team Tate Finale

December

12/6 — UFC Fight Night: Hunt vs. Bigfoot

12/14 — UFC on Fox: Johnson vs. Benavidez 2

12/28 — UFC 168: Weidman vs. Silva 2

Motorsport

Mountain biking

Nordic skiing

Orienteering

2013 Orienteering World Cup
 January 6: #1 in 
 Winners:  Fabian Hertner (m) /  Helena Jansson (f)
 January 8: #2 in 
 Winners:  Matthias Kyburz (m) /  Tove Alexandersson (f)
 January 13: #3 in 
 Winners:  Jerker Lysell (m) /  Tove Alexandersson (f)
 June 1: #4 in 
 Winners:  Matthias Kyburz (m) /  Simone Niggli-Luder (f)
 June 2: #5 in 
 Winners:  Carl Kaas Codager (m) /  Simone Niggli-Luder (f)
 June 4: #6 in 
 June 7: #7 in 
 Winners:  Matthias Kyburz (m) /  Simone Niggli-Luder (f)
 June 8: #8 in 
 October 5: #9 in 
 Winners:  Daniel Hubmann (m) /  Simone Niggli-Luder (f)
 October 6: #10 in 
 Winners:  Matthias Kyburz (m) /  Simone Niggli-Luder (f)

International and Continental events
 January 6–13: 2013 Oceania Orienteering Championships in 
 Sprint winners:  Toby Scott (m) /  Angela Simpson (f)
 Middle distance winners:  Kasimir Gregory (m) /  Lauren Gillis (f)
 Long distance winners:  Thomas Reynolds (m) /  Grace Crane (f)
 Relay winners:  (m) /  (f)
 February 22 – 24: Mediterranean Championships in Orienteering 2013 in 
 Sprint winners:  Daniel Hubmann (m) /  Lena Eliasson (f)
 Middle distance winners:  Baptiste Rollier (m) /  Silje Ekroll Jahren (f)
 April 13: Central European Spring Orienteering Meeting, Stage 1 in 
 Sprint winners:  Jan Procházka (m) /  Elisa Elstner (f)
 May 18: Baltic Championships in 
 Long distance winners:  Timo Sild (m) /  Indrė Valaitė
 July 31 – August 7: 2013 World Orienteering Championships in  Vuokatti
 Long distance #1 winners:  Edgars Bertuks (m) /  Simone Niggli-Luder (f)
 Long distance #2 winners:  Tero Föhr (m) /  Tove Alexandersson (f)
 Long distance #3 winners:  Jani Lakanen (m) /  Catherine Taylor (f)
 Long distance #4 winners:  Thierry Gueorgiou (m) /  Simone Niggli-Luder (f)
 Sprint #1 winners:  Mårten Boström (m) /  Simone Niggli-Luder (f)
 Sprint #2 winners:  Jerker Lysell (m) /  Maja Alm (f)
 Sprint #3 winners:  Øystein Kvaal Østerbø (m) /  Galina Vinogradova (f)
 Sprint #4 winners:  Rasmus Thrane Hansen (m) /  Simone Niggli-Luder (f)
 Middle distance #1 winners:  Daniel Hubmann (m) /  Annika Billstam (f)
 Middle distance #2 winners:  Kalvis Mihailovs (m) /  Inga Dambe (f)
 Middle distance #3 winners:  Matthias Kyburz (m) /  Tove Alexandersson (f)
 Middle distance #4 winners:  Leonid Novikov (m) /  Simone Niggli-Luder (f)
 September 5–7: South East European Orienteering Championships 2013 in 
 Sprint winners:  Ionut Zinca (m) /  Alicia Cobo Caballero (f)
 Long distance winners:  Ionut Zinca (m) /  Nataliya Dimitrova (f)
 Middle distance winners:  Ionut Zinca (m) /  Veronica Minoiu (f)
 November 17: South American Orienteering Championship in 
 Winners:  Cleber Baratto Vidal (m) /  Miriam Ferraz Pasturiza (f)

Rhythmic gymnastics

Rink hockey
 September 20–28: 2013 FIRS Men's Roller Hockey World Cup in  Luanda and Namibe (now Moçâmedes)
  defeated  4–3 to claim its sixteenth title.
 October 6–12: 2013 FIRS Roller Hockey World Cup U-20 in  Cartagena
  defeated  4–1 to claim its second title.

Road cycling

Roller derby
 November 8–10: The 2013 Women's Flat Track Derby Association Championships in  Milwaukee, hosted by the Brewcity Bruisers.
 Winner:  Gotham Girls Roller Derby

Rowing

Rugby league

  won its 10th title by defeating  34–2 in the final.

Rugby union

 2 February – 16 March: Six Nations Championship
 defended their RBS 6 Nations crown with a 30–3 victory against . 26th title.
 May 17: Amlin Challenge Cup Final at RDS Arena, Dublin:
  Leinster defeat  Stade Français 34–13 to claim the first Challenge Cup title for an Irish side.
 May 18: Heineken Cup Final at Aviva Stadium, Dublin:
  Toulon defeat  Clermont 16–15 to win their first European trophy.
 May 28 – June 9: 2013 IRB Junior World Rugby Trophy in Temuco, Chile
Italy claim their second title and earn promotion to the 2014 IRB Junior World Championship.
 June 1 – July 6: British & Irish Lions tour to Australia
 The Lions win the three-Test series against  2–1. It is the Lions' first series win since defeating  in 1997.
 IRB Sevens World Series:
New Zealand claim their third consecutive series crown and 11th overall.
 World Series Core Team Qualifier: ,  and  all retain their core team status for the 2013–14 series.
 IRB Women's Sevens World Series:
New Zealand claim the inaugural series crown.
 June 5–23: 2013 IRB Junior World Championship in France
England win their first title. The  finishes last and is relegated to the 2014 IRB Junior World Rugby Trophy.
 June 28–30: 2013 Rugby World Cup Sevens in Moscow, Russia
New Zealand win their second title.
New Zealand win their first title.
 15 February – 13 July: Super Rugby: The  Chiefs top the regular-season table.
 Super Rugby Final, August 3 at Waikato Stadium, Hamilton, New Zealand:
 The Chiefs successfully defend their title from last season, defeating the  Brumbies 27–22. It is also the second Super Rugby title for the Chiefs.
 In the  South African promotion/relegation playoff, held over two legs on July 26 and August 3, the Lions defeat the Kings 44–42. The Lions will replace the Kings for the 2014 season.
 August 17 – October 5: The Rugby Championship
  sweep all six matches for the second consecutive year, maintaining their 100% record since the competition was expanded to include Argentina in 2012. Including the competition's previous history as the Tri Nations, it is the 10th title for the All Blacks.

Domestic competitions
  Top League Final, 27 January at Chichibunomiya Rugby Stadium, Tokyo:
Suntory Sungoliath defeat Toshiba Brave Lupus 19–3 to defend their title from last season. It is also Suntory's third league title overall.
  English Premiership Final, May 25 at Twickenham, London:
Leicester Tigers defeat Northampton Saints 37–17 to claim their 10th Premiership crown.
 RFU Championship Final, May 23 and 30:
Newcastle Falcons defeat Bedford Blues 49–33 on aggregate in the two-legged final. As Newcastle were confirmed as meeting the Premiership's minimum standards, they replaced the Premiership's bottom club, London Welsh.
  Top 14 Final, June 1 at Stade de France, Saint-Denis:
Castres defeat Toulon 19–14 to claim their fourth title, and first since 1993.
 Rugby Pro D2:
Oyonnax automatically promoted to Top 14 as champion. Brive also earn promotion as winner of playoffs between the next four teams. They replaced the bottom two teams in Top 14, Agen and Mont-de-Marsan.
     Pro12 Final, May 25 at RDS Arena, Dublin:
  Leinster, fresh off victory in the Amlin Challenge Cup, defeat  Ulster 24–18 for their third Celtic League/Pro12 title.
   LV Cup (Anglo-Welsh Cup):  Harlequins
  ITM Cup
 Premiership Final, October 26 at Westpac Stadium, Wellington:  defeat  29–13 to claim their sixth consecutive title in New Zealand's top level, and 11th overall.
 Championship Final, October 25 at Trafalgar Park, Nelson:  defeat  26–25 and are promoted to the 2014 ITM Premiership, replacing bottom-placed .
  Currie Cup Final, October 26 at Newlands, Cape Town:
 The  defeat Western Province 33–19 for their seventh Currie Cup crown.

Sailing (yachting)

Short-track speed skating

Snowboarding

Speed skating (long-track)

Squash

Sumo

Tennis

Australian Open
26 January: Victoria Azarenka defeated Li Na 4–6, 6–4, 6–3. Second title.
27 January: Novak Djokovic defeated Andy Murray 6–7 7–6 6–3 6–2. Sixth Grand Slam title. Fourth Australian Open, third in a row.
French Open
June 8: Serena Williams defeated Maria Sharapova 6–4 6–4.
June 9: Rafael Nadal defeated David Ferrer 6–3, 6–2, 6–3.
The Championships, Wimbledon
July 6: Marion Bartoli defeated Sabine Lisicki 6–1, 6–4. First Grand Slam title.
July 7: Andy Murray defeated Novak Djokovic 6–4, 7–5, 6–4. Murray becomes the first British winner of the Gentlemen's Singles at Wimbledon since Fred Perry in 1936, and also earns his second Grand Slam title.
US Open
September 8: Serena Williams defeated Victoria Azarenka 7–5, 6–7(6–8), 6–1. 17th Grand Slam title.
September 9: Rafael Nadal defeated Novak Djokovic 6–2, 3–6, 6–4, 6–1. 13th Grand Slam title.
WTA Tour Championships
 Winner: Serena Williams. 11th title.
ATP World Tour Finals
 Winner: Novak Djokovic.
Hopman Cup 29 December 2012 – 5 January 2013
  defeated  in the final by the score of 2–1 . Fourth title.
Fed Cup
  defeated  4–0, to claim their fourth title.
Davis Cup
  defeated  3–2, to claim their third title.

Other events
 July 6: Bob and Mike Bryan win the Gentlemen's Doubles at Wimbledon, becoming the first men's doubles team in the Open era to hold all four Grand Slam titles at once.

Track cycling

Trampolining

Triathlon

Volleyball

Water polo

Weightlifting

Whitewater (canoe) slalom

Wrestling
 September 16–22: 2013 World Wrestling Championships in  Budapest
  won the gold medal tally.  won the overall medal tally.

Multi-sport events
 29 January – 5 February: 2013 Special Olympics World Winter Games in Pyeongchang, South Korea
Alpine skiing results here.
Cross country skiing results here.
Figure skating results here.
Floor hockey results here.
Floorball results here.
Short track speed skating results here.
Snowboarding results here.
Snowshoeing results here.
 March 3–17: 2013 Central American Games in San José, Costa Rica
  won both the gold and overall medal tallies.
 March 25–29: 2013 CSIM World Winter Games in Annecy, France
 Host nation, won both gold and overall medal tallies.
 May 27 – June 1: 2013 Games of the Small States of Europe in Luxembourg City, Luxembourg
 Host nation, won both the gold and overall medal tallies.
 June 20–30: 2013 Mediterranean Games in Mersin, Turkey
  won both the gold and overall medal tallies.
 June 29 – July 6: 2013 Asian Indoor and Martial Arts Games in Incheon, South Korea (formerly the Asian Indoor Games and the Asian Martial Arts Games separately)
  won the gold medal tally. Host nation, won the overall medal tally.
 July 6–17: 2013 Summer Universiade in Kazan, Russia
 Host nation,  Russia, won both the gold and overall medal tallies.
 July 13–19: 2013 Island Games in Bermuda
  won both the gold and overall medal tallies.
 July 18–30: 2013 Maccabiah Games in Jerusalem, Israel
 Host nation, won both the gold and overall medal tallies.
 July 25 – August 4: World Games 2013 in Cali, Colombia
  won the gold medal tally;  won the overall medal tally.
 July 26 – August 4: 2013 Summer Deaflympics in Sofia, Bulgaria
  won both the gold and overall medal tallies.
 July 28 – August 4: 2013 World Transplant Games in Durban, South Africa
 Link to results here.
 August 1–10: 2013 World Police and Fire Games in Belfast, Northern Ireland, UK
 The  won both the gold and overall medal tallies.
 August 3–11: 2013 World Masters Games in Turin, Italy
 Link to results here.
 September 2–12: 2013 Pacific Mini Games in Mata-Utu, Wallis and Futuna
  won the gold medal tally.  won the overall medal tally.
 September 6–15: 2013 Jeux de la Francophonie in Nice
 Host nation, won both the gold and overall medal tallies.
 September 22 – October 1: 2013 Islamic Solidarity Games in Palembang
 Host nation, won both the gold and overall medal tallies.
 October 6–15: 2013 East Asian Games in Tianjin
 Host nation, won both the gold and overall medal tallies.
 October 18–26: SportAccord 2013 World Combat Games in Saint Petersburg
 Host nation, won both the gold and overall medal tallies.
 November 16–30: 2013 Bolivarian Games in Trujillo, Peru
  won the gold medal tally.  won the overall medal tally.
 December 11–21: 2013 Winter Universiade in Trentino, Italy
  won both the gold and overall medal tallies.
 December 11–22: 2013 Southeast Asian Games in Naypyidaw, Myanmar
  won both the gold and overall medal tallies.
 December 12–18: 2013 SportAccord World Mind Games in Beijing
 Host nation, won both the gold and overall medal tallies.

References

External links
 The-Sports.org
  accessed on 09-November–2012

 
Sports by year